The 47th Golden Globe Awards, honoring the best in film and television for 1989, were held on January 20, 1990 at the Beverly Hilton. The nominations were announced on December 27, 1989.

Winners and nominees

Film

The following films received multiple nominations:

The following films received multiple wins:

Television

The following programs received multiple nominations

The following programs received multiple wins:

Ceremony

Presenters 

 Kristian Alfonso
 Debbie Allen
 Don Ameche
 Scott Bakula
 Gary Busey
 Joan Collins
 Richard Crenna
 Faye Dunaway
 Peter Falk
 Sara Gilbert
 Linda Gray
 Richard Grieco
 Michael Gross
 Neil Patrick Harris
 David Hasselhoff
 Katherine Helmond
 Isabelle Huppert
 Ann Jillian
 James Earl Jones
 Christine Lahti
 Dorothy Lamour
 Martin Landau
 Patti LuPone
 Kristy McNichol
 Pat Morita
 Craig T. Nelson
 Kim Novak
 Edward James Olmos
 Gregory Peck
 George Peppard
 Emma Samms
 Tom Selleck
 Jane Seymour
 Ray Sharkey
 Tom Skerritt
 Suzanne Somers
 Joan Van Ark
 JoBeth Williams
 James Woods

Cecil B. DeMille Award 
Audrey Hepburn

See also
 62nd Academy Awards
 10th Golden Raspberry Awards
 41st Primetime Emmy Awards
 42nd Primetime Emmy Awards
 43rd British Academy Film Awards
 44th Tony Awards
 1989 in film
 1989 in American television

References

047
1989 film awards
1989 television awards
January 1990 events in the United States
Golden